Daudpur Bazar Union is a union, the smallest administrative body of Bangladesh, located in Rupganj Upazila, Narayanganj District, Bangladesh. The total population is 39,683.

References

Unions of Rupganj Upazila